Cottagecore is an internet aesthetic popularised by adolescents and young adults celebrating an idealized rural life. Traditionally based on a rural English and European life, it was developed throughout the 2010s and was first named cottagecore on Tumblr in 2018. The aesthetic centres on traditional rural clothing, interior design, and crafts such as drawing, baking, and pottery, and is related to similar aesthetic movements such as grandmacore, farmcore, goblincore, and fairycore.

Some sources describe cottagecore as a subculture of Millennials and Generation Z.  Economic forces and other challenges facing these young people may be a significant driver of this trend, along with these generations' emphasis on sustainability, and the recent trend to work from home (initially during the COVID-19 pandemic).

Aesthetic and lifestyle elements

The tenets of cottagecore can help to satisfy for its proponents a desire for "an aspirational form of nostalgia" as well as an escape from many forms of stress and trauma. The New York Times described it as a reaction to hustle culture and the advent of personal branding. The Guardian called it a "visual and lifestyle movement designed to fetishize the wholesome purity of the outdoors." Cottagecore emphasizes simplicity and the soft peacefulness of the pastoral life as an escape from the dangers of the modern world. It became highly popular on social media during the COVID-19 pandemic.

Fashion 

An early inspiration for cottagecore fashion is mori girl, which reached popularity in Japan in the late 2000s. While homemade clothing is a feature of cottagecore, products including the 'strawberry dress', a $490 tea dress by Lirika Matoshi, are also associated with the aesthetic. Due to the high price of the Matoshi dress, a number of people produced their own versions of the product. Cottagecore clothing often includes long layered dresses.

Analytics company Edited identified that besides floral prints and stripes "Old-world, feminine shapes and details are integral to this aesthetic—milkmaid necklines, puff sleeves, ruffles and prairie-inspired midi dresses." Marketing commentators noted that the trend fits with already available '70s-inspired dresses, lace trim, and denim, and complemented the slow fashion trend.

Food and gardening 

Growing one's own food in one's own garden and baking one's own bread all reflect the philosophy of self-sufficiency of cottagecore, though the aesthetic does not demand living in the countryside. Cottagecore gardening is intended to be environmentally friendly, often including permacultural farming practices. For example, the cultivation of a variety of perennial and annual native plants (i.e. plants endemic to the areas near one's home) helps attract insects, including bees, and as such promotes biodiversity and increases pollination of food-producing crops.

Other aspects 
The aesthetic encourages taking care of oneself physically and mentally. Followers of cottagecore typically purchase secondhand or vintage furniture. They may take up hobbies including knitting, crochet, painting, and reading.

Antecedents and cultural context

While cottagecore arose as a named aesthetic in 2018, similar aesthetics and ideals existed prior to its inception. The ancient Greeks characterised Arcadia as a representation of an idyllic pastoral setting. The Greek poet Theocritus wrote poems about shepherds and shepherdesses in the third century BC, leading to him being often cited as the inventor of pastoral poetry.  The market for Theocritus’ work was primarily the educated urban class of Alexandria, Egypt, seeking an escape from the filth, crowding and disease of city life. In the first century BC the Roman poet Virgil’s pastoral poetry was written in response to the violence and chaos of war. However, he expanded the genre by acknowledging contemporary moral and political issues such as war whilst maintaining a distance through the pastoral trope. Pastoral escapism continued to be produced for the courtly audience of the Roman Empire in the format of novels such as Daphnis and Chloe from the second century AD.

The fourteenth century Italian Renaissance poet Petrarch was known for his hill-walking and gardening as well as his pastoral poetry. English playwright William Shakespeare wrote two pastoral plays: As You Like It and A Winter’s Tale. Christopher Marlowe’s renowned poem The Passionate Shepherd to His Love inspired a poetic response written by Walter Raleigh, The Nymph's Reply to the Shepherd, in which the speaker observes that Arcadian ideas were fallacies.

In eighteenth-century Europe it was fashionable to build follies, ornamental structures often built in the style of classical architecture or to mimic rustic villages. Marie Antoinette's Hameau de la Reine, a rustic model village, is a primary example of a folly in a pastoral style.

The Arts and Crafts movement of the nineteenth century was an approach to art, architecture, and design that embraced 'folk' styles and techniques as a critique of industrial production.

The counterculture of the 1960s provides perhaps the most significant source of influence for the contemporary cottagecore movement. Many of the subcategories of cottagecore directly invoke the aesthetic of environmentally conscious architectural projects and communes of the era such as Drop City, and embody the radically sustainable, hands-on ethos of publications such as the Whole Earth Catalog. Thrifted furniture and art pieces from the 1960s and '70s are often used to create a comforting, cozy interior space, as are patterns of the era such as paisley and mushroom prints.

There have been similar aesthetics in different countries, such as iki, or detached elegance, from Japan, fernweh, or being somewhere far away and mysterious, from Germany, or hygge, or satisfying comfort, from Denmark.

Contemporary popularity 
Prior to the Great Recession, Thomas Kinkade sold millions of copies of his paintings of idyllic cottages.

The movement gained further traction in many online spheres and on social media in 2020 due to the mass quarantining in response to the COVID-19 pandemic. Networks such as the blogging site Tumblr had a 150% increase in cottagecore posts in the three months from March to May 2020. It spread on Pinterest, a platform for sharing visual ideas. It became popular on TikTok as well, with numerous cottagecore enthusiasts sharing videos of themselves living in rural areas, bathing in the forest, or baking bread.

On TikTok, the LGBT+ community has been particularly fond of cottagecore, especially lesbians. Many young women have found a sense of femininity through dressing in a cottagecore aesthetic while still feeling aligned with a modern, in-control woman archetype. The New Yorker asserted that such videos had "evoked a mood of calm, enlightened, prettified productivity." Vox characterized the trend as "the aesthetic where quarantine is romantic instead of terrifying."

Living in the style of cottagecore or simply looking at others doing the same on the Internet was seen as something that could help people de-stress. Speaking to CNN, psychologist Krystine Batcho noted that it should be no surprise nostalgia in general and cottagecore in particular was in vogue during such a stressful time. "Longing for simpler situations, simpler time periods or simpler ways of living is an effort to balance out and to counteract the effects of high intense stress," she said. This was a period when many urban residents questioned whether it was worth living in the cities, and rural life stood up as an appealing alternative.

A New York Times article compared cottagecore to the social simulation video game series Animal Crossing being acted out in real life, coinciding with the success of the then-newest entry in the franchise Animal Crossing: New Horizons. In July 2021 The Sims 4 released an expansion pack called "Cottage Living", which focuses on floral prints, gardening and tending to animals like chickens and llamas.

In July 2020, American singer-songwriter Taylor Swift released her eighth studio album, Folklore, a critical and commercial success. It features songs written during the lockdown. The album's use of cottagecore in its visuals and lyrics has been credited with increasing the aesthetic's popularity. She continued the aesthetic with its follow-up record, Evermore (2020), and applied it to her performance at the 63rd Annual Grammy Awards. The music videos for "Cardigan" and "Willow" both incorporate cottagecore imagery. Other public figures who embraced this style include British actress Millie Bobby Brown, English musician Harry Styles, and English footballer David Beckham.

In the United States, cottagecore became a decorating trend for the 2020 holiday season while the sales of needlework kits skyrocketed. According to the Royal Horticultural Society of the United Kingdom, cottage gardening is a trend for 2021. 

China has its own version of cottagecore. Even though the country is rapidly urbanizing as part of economic development, many young people have decided to leave the cities after their university studies for their hometowns in the countryside, where the quality of life has improved thanks to, among other things, the availability of fast Internet access, new roads, and high-speed railways. Among the returning youths are cottagecore-minded architects.

Critiques
According to critics, cottagecore offers an unrealistic, romanticized view of rural life. Critics note the contrast between idyllic depictions of rural life constructed by the aesthetic and some of the realities of such spaces, such as the effects of rural poverty or sanitation.

Rebecca Jennings, writing for Vox magazine, describes cottagecore and dark academia as "historical aesthetics that evoke conservative values and gender roles" including Eurocentrism and heteronormativity.

See also

 1960s decor
 1970s in fashion
 Agrarianism
 Back-to-the-land movement
 Food forest
 Food security
 Hauntology
 Homesteading
 Neo-Victorian
 Nostalgia consumption
 Primitive decorating
 Queer anti-urbanism
 Retro style
 Shabby chic
 Rewilding (conservation biology)
 Anarcho-primitivism
 Solarpunk

References

2010s fads and trends
2020s fads and trends
Interior design
Internet memes
Lifestyles
Nostalgia
Virtual communities
Simple living
Rural culture
Fashion aesthetics
Youth culture